This is a list of influential African guitarists.

Guitarists 

 Ibrahim Ag Alhabib - guitarist of the band Tinariwen
 Barthelemy Attisso - lead guitarist of Orchestre Baobab, of Senegal
 Afel Bocoum - Malian guitarist, Ali Farka Touré's noted protégé
 Omara "Bombino" Moctar - internationally acclaimed Tuareg guitarist and singer-songwriter from Agadez, Niger
 Henri Bowane - a figure in the development of Congo rumba, early mentor to Franco
 Oliver De Coque - Ogene Sound Super of Africa
 Victor Démé - Singer and guitarist from Burkina Faso
 Fatoumata Diawara - Malian guitarist and singer
 Diblo Dibala - Congolese soukous musician, known as "Machine Gun" for his speed and skill on the guitar
 Mamadou Diop (also known as Modou Diop) - Senegalese rhythm guitarist, now based in the United States
 Sona Jobarteh - Griot kora player, singer and guitarist from Gambia
 Nico Kasanda (a.k.a. "Dr. Nico") - a pioneer of soukous music
 Omar Khorshid - Influential egyptian pioneer guitar virtuoso who accompanied many singers, including Farid Al Atrash, Umm Kulthum, Mohamed Abdel Wahab, and Abdel Halim Hafez.
 Habib Koité - vocalist and guitarist from Mali
 Ismaël Lô - Senegalese musician and actor
 Alick Macheso - lead guitarist of Orchestra Mberikwazvo, of Zimbabwe
 François Luambo Makiadi (a.k.a. "Franco") - Congolese musician; founder of the seminal group OK Jazz
 Michelino Mavatiku Visi (a.k.a "Michelino") - a Soukous recording artist, composer, guitarist and vocalist.
 Nico Mbarga - lead guitarist; composer of the hit song "Sweet Mother"
 Louis Mhlanga - Zimbabwean guitarist and producer
 Oliver Mtukudzi - guitarist from Zimbabwe; leader of the Black Spirits
 Mono Mukundu - Zimbabwean music producer, composer, and multi-instrumentalist
 Jean-Bosco Mwenda - pioneer of African fingerstyle in 1950s, Congo
 Ray Phiri - lead guitarist from Mpumalanga, South Africa; guitar sessions on Paul Simon's album Graceland
 Jonah Sithole - Zimbabwean guitarist, played with Thomas Mapfumo
 Ebo Taylor - Ghanaian Highlife and Afrobeat guitarist, friend of Fela Kuti
 Boubacar Traoré - Malian folk and blues guitarist
 Djelimady Tounkara - lead guitarist for the Super Rail Band of Bamako, Mali
 Ali Farka Touré - singer and guitarist from Malif
 Vieux Farka Touré - son of Ali Farka Touré; young rising star from Mali
 Rokia Traoré - Malian songwriter and guitarist
 Sir Victor Uwaifo - guitarist from bini/Edo speaking people, based in Benin City, Edo State, Nigeria
 Dr Sir Warrior - vocalist and guitarist of Oriental Brothers International Band

African
Guitarists